Selected Poems is a collection of poems by American poet Robert Pinsky selected and edited by America’s 39th Poet Laureate Consultant in Poetry to the Library of Congress. 

The first hardback edition was published by Farrar, Straus and Giroux  in 2011; the first paperback edition was published by Farrar, Straus and Giroux in 2012

Notes and references

American poetry collections
Poetry anthologies
Farrar, Straus and Giroux books